Partridge Township may refer to the following townships in the United States:

 Partridge Township, Woodford County, Illinois
 Partridge Township, Pine County, Minnesota